Amb. Ismail Sheikh Hassan or Ismail Sheikh Hassan Nuriye  also referred to as His Excelleny H.E Mohamed Sheikh,was a  prominent ambassador for Ethiopia. Ismail Sheikh Hassan was 1 of the 3 ambassadorial brothers from Ethiopia, Djibouti and Somalia, all ethnic Somalis, the other 2 brothers were  Mohamed Sheikh Hassan and Aden Sheikh Hassan.  All from the same  prominent family who were one of the most interesting in the Horn of Africa.The first time in history 3 Somali brothers managed to become ambassadors in 3 neighboring countries.

History 
Ismail hails from a prominent family who were one of the most interesting in the Horn of Africa. They are known as the Ambassadorial Brothers. His father Sheikh Hassan Nuriye was a prominent Sheikh in Ethiopia, Djibouti and Somalia. Sheikh Hassan had sired three sons who represented three African countries at ambassadorial level. Ismail brothers are Mohamed Sheikh Hassan who represented Somalia at ambassadorial level and was the ambassador to Canada, Nigeria and South Africa. His other brother Adan was the Djiboutian ambassador to Oman and the Kingdom of Saudi Arabia.

Ismail Sheikh Hassan belongs to the Rer Ughaz (Reer Ugaas), Makahiildheere (Makahildere), subsection of the Makahiil (Makahil) branch of the Gadabursi (Gadabuursi).  Ismail served his country Ethiopia as ambassador to Libya.

Career 
 Ambassador for Ethiopia to Libya

Family tree 
 Sheikh Hassan Nuriye, Father of all 3 Ambassadors and prominent Sheikh in all 3 countries
 Mohamed Sheikh Hassan - Ambassador for Somalia to United Arab Republic,  Canada and Nigeria
 Ismail Sheikh Hassan - Ambassador for Ethiopia to Libya
 Aden Sheikh Hassan - Ambassador for Djibouti to Oman and Saudi Arabia

References

Ambassadors of Ethiopia to Libya
Gadabuursi

Year of birth missing
Year of death missing